Cristiano da Silva Santos or simply Cristiano (born May 16, 1987 in Pedro Leopoldo-MG), is a Brazilian striker for Ypiranga.

Contract
CRB (Loan) 2 January 2008 to 30 November 2008
Atlético Mineiro 18 March 2007 to 18 March 2009

External links
 

1987 births
Living people
Brazilian footballers
Brazilian expatriate footballers
Association football forwards
Clube Atlético Mineiro players
Clube de Regatas Brasil players
Clube Náutico Capibaribe players
Villa Nova Atlético Clube players
Mogi Mirim Esporte Clube players
Joinville Esporte Clube players
Associação Chapecoense de Futebol players
Al-Shorta SC players
Ipatinga Futebol Clube players
Rio Branco Esporte Clube players
América Futebol Clube (MG) players
Clube Atlético Linense players
Associação Atlética Caldense players
Cuiabá Esporte Clube players
Chiangrai United F.C. players
Sisaket F.C. players
Clube Atlético Votuporanguense players
Ypiranga Futebol Clube players
Expatriate footballers in Iraq
Expatriate footballers in Thailand
Brazilian expatriate sportspeople in Iraq
Brazilian expatriate sportspeople in Thailand